Weightlifting was contested from October 3 to October 10, 1994, at the 1994 Asian Games in Saeki Ward Sports Center, Hiroshima, Japan.

Medalists

Men

Women

Medal table

References
Weightlifting Database
Results

 
1994 Asian Games events
1994
Asian Games
1994 Asian Games
1994